Mordellistena mahena is a species of beetles is the family Mordellidae.

References

mahena
Beetles described in 1854